The 1970 Washington Senators season involved the Senators finishing sixth in the American League East with a record of 70 wins and 92 losses. This was the franchise's penultimate season in Washington, D.C.

Offseason 
 December 5, 1969: Dennis Higgins and Barry Moore were traded by the Senators to the Cleveland Indians for Horacio Piña, Ron Law and Dave Nelson.
 December 31, 1969: Johnny Roseboro was signed as a free agent by the Senators.
 January 17, 1970: Bill Madlock was drafted by the Senators in the 5th round of the 1970 Major League Baseball Draft (Secondary Phase). Player signed May 25, 1970.
 March 21, 1970: Brant Alyea was traded by the Senators to the Minnesota Twins for Joe Grzenda and Charley Walters.
 March 30, 1970: Pedro Ramos was signed as a free agent by the Senators.

Regular season

Opening Day starters 
Hank Allen
Dick Bosman
Ed Brinkman
Paul Casanova
Mike Epstein
Frank Howard
Ken McMullen
Dave Nelson
Del Unser

Season standings

Record vs. opponents

Notable transactions 
 April 27, 1970: Pedro Ramos was released by the Senators.
 April 27, 1970: Ken McMullen was traded by the Senators to the California Angels for Aurelio Rodríguez and Rick Reichardt.
 May 11, 1970: Hank Allen and Ron Theobald were traded by the Senators to the Milwaukee Brewers for Wayne Comer.
 June 4, 1970: 1970 Major League Baseball Draft
Rick Waits was drafted by the Senators in the 5th round.
Bruce Sutter was drafted by the Senators in the 21st round, but did not sign.
 August 19, 1970: Johnny Roseboro was released by the Senators.
 September 11, 1970: Lee Maye was selected off waivers from the Senators by the Chicago White Sox.

Roster

Player stats

Batting

Starters by position 
Note: Pos = Position; G = Games played; AB = At bats; H = Hits; Avg. = Batting average; HR = Home runs; RBI = Runs batted in

Other batters 
Note: G = Games played; AB = At bats; H = Hits; Avg. = Batting average; HR = Home runs; RBI = Runs batted in

Pitching

Starting pitchers 
Note: G = Games pitched; IP = Innings pitched; W = Wins; L = Losses; ERA = Earned run average; SO = Strikeouts

Other pitchers 
Note: G = Games pitched; IP = Innings pitched; W = Wins; L = Losses; ERA = Earned run average; SO = Strikeouts

Relief pitchers 
Note: G = Games pitched; W = Wins; L = Losses; SV = Saves; ERA = Earned run average; SO = Strikeouts

Awards and honors 
Frank Howard, A.L. Home Run Champion 1970
All-Star Game

Farm system

Notes

References 

1970 Washington Senators team page at Baseball Reference
1970 Washington Senators team page at www.baseball-almanac.com

Texas Rangers seasons
Washington Senators season
Washing